Total is the third studio album by Norwegian rock band Seigmen. It was released on 21 October 1994, through record label 1:70.

Track listing

Release 

The album was certified gold in Norway in 2006.

Personnel 

 Alex Møklebust – vocals
 Kim Ljung - vocals, bass guitar
 Noralf Ronthi – drums, percussion, vocals
 Sverre Økshoff – guitar
 Marius Roth – guitar, acoustic guitar, vocals

 Technical

 Sylvia Massy – production, engineering, mixing on all tracks except 7
 Eivind Skovdahl – engineering assistance
 Robert Opsahl-Engen – engineering assistance
 Bel Digital – mastering

References

External links 

 

1994 albums
Seigmen albums